For the Summer Olympics, there are seven venues that have been or will be used for golf.

References

Golf
Venues
Golf-related lists